Microcleidus is an extinct genus of sauropterygian reptile belonging to the Plesiosauroidea. The species has 40 neck vertebrae and a short tail of 28 vertebrae. Fossils of the genus have been found in France, the Posidonia Shale in Germany and Luxembourg, and the Alum Shale Formation of England.

Description

Classification

 

Species include: Microcleidus homalospondylus (Owen 1865) and Microcleidus macropterus (Seeley 1865).

Occitanosaurus tournemirensis (originally "Plesiosaurus" tournemirensis), was named by Sciau et al. in 1990, based on a nearly complete skeleton of an animal approximately 4 meters (13 ft) long. It was later found to be a species of Microcleidus.

The following cladogram follows an analysis by Ketchum & Benson, 2011.

See also 
 List of plesiosaur genera
 Timeline of plesiosaur research

References

Bibliography 
 Bardet, Nathalie; Fernandez, Marta; Garcia-Ramos, Jose Carlos; Superbiola, Xabier Pereda; Pinuela, Laura; Ruiz-Omenaca, Jose Ignacio; and Vincent, Peggy (2008). "A juvenile plesiosaur from the Pliensbackian (Lower Jurassic) of Asturias, Spain". Journal of Vertebrate Paleontology 28(1): 258–263
  Plesiosaur.com 13 Oct 2006
  Palæos.com 13 Oct 2006
 

Plesiosauroids
Early Jurassic plesiosaurs of Europe
Toarcian genera
Jurassic England
Fossils of England
Jurassic France
Fossils of France
Jurassic Germany
Fossils of Germany
Posidonia Shale
Fossil taxa described in 1909
Sauropterygian genera